Roy Arthur Taylor (January 31, 1910 – November 28, 1995) was a U.S. Representative from North Carolina.

Born in Vader, Washington, Taylor graduated from Asheville-Biltmore College, Asheville, North Carolina, 1929.
He graduated from Maryville College, Maryville, Tennessee, 1931.
J.D., Asheville University Law School, Asheville, North Carolina, 1936.
He was a lawyer in private practice.
He was in the United States Navy from 1943 to 1946.
He served as member of the North Carolina general assembly from 1947 to 1949 and 1951 to 1953.

Taylor was elected as a Democrat to the Eighty-sixth Congress, by special election, to fill the vacancy caused by the death of United States Representative David M. Hall.  He was reelected to eight succeeding Congresses and served from June 25, 1960 to January 3, 1977.

He was not a candidate for reelection to the Ninety-fifth Congress in 1976.

In 1986, he received an honorary Doctor of Law from the University of North Carolina at Asheville

He died on November 28, 1995 in Black Mountain, North Carolina, and was interred in Mountain View Memorial Gardens in the same town.

External links

References

1910 births
1995 deaths
Maryville College alumni
University of North Carolina at Asheville alumni
United States Navy personnel of World War II
People from Lewis County, Washington
Democratic Party members of the United States House of Representatives from North Carolina
20th-century American politicians